John Towne (1711?–1791) was an English churchman and controversialist, archdeacon of Stow from 1765.

Life
Born about 1711, was educated at Clare Hall, Cambridge, where he graduated B.A. in 1732 and M.A. in 1736.

Towne became vicar of Thorpe-Ernald, Leicestershire, on 22 June 1740, and archdeacon of Stowe in 1765. He was a prebendary of Lincoln Cathedral, and rector of Little Paunton, Lincolnshire. He was a friend of William Warburton.

Towne died on 15 March 1791 at Little Paunton, where he was buried, a mural tablet being erected to his memory in the church. By his wife Anne, who died on 31 January 1754, he left three daughters and one son, who became a painter and died young.

Works
His works are:

 A Critical Inquiry into the Opinions and Practice of the Ancient Philosophers, concerning the nature of the Soul and a Future State, and their method of teaching by the double doctrine, (anon.), London, 1747. With a preface by William Warburton; 2nd edit. London, 1748.
 The Argument of the Divine Legation, fairly stated and returned to the Deists, to whom it was originally addressed’ London, 1751. Defence of Warburton's The Divine Legation of Moses.
 A Free and Candid Examination of the Principles advanced in the … Bishop of London's  … Sermons, lately published; and in his … Discourses on Prophecy (anon.), London, 1756. To Thomas Sherlock.
 Dissertation on the Antient Mysteries, London, 1766.
 Remarks on Dr. Lowth's Letter to the Bishop of Gloucester. With the Bishop's Appendix, and the second Epistolary Correspondence between his Lordship and the Doctor annexed (anon.), 2 pts. London, 1766. On the debate of Warburton with Robert Lowth.
 Exposition of the Orthodox System of Civil Rights, and Church Power; addressed to Dr. Stebbing. To Henry Stebbing.

References

Notes

Attribution

1711 births
1791 deaths
18th-century English Anglican priests
Archdeacons of Stow
18th-century Anglican theologians